Mihailo Mušikić (born 25 March 2002) is a Serbian professional basketball player for Mega Basket of the ABA League and the Basketball League of Serbia.

Early life and career 
Mušikić grew up with the Sloga youth system before joining the Mega Basket youth system in January 2018. He was a member of the Mega U19 team that won the Junior ABA League for the 2020–21 season, recording 15 points, nine rebounds, and two assists per game.

Professional career 
In April 2020, Mušikić officially signed his first professional contract with Mega Basket. Also, he joined OKK Beograd on a two-way contract for the 2020–21 and 2021–22 KLS seasons. Mušikić made his senior debut in the ABA League for Mega Basket on 20 January 2022 in a 93–90 win over Partizan NIS, making 10 points, 2 rebounds and an assist in under 20 minutes of playing time.

National team career 
In August 2018, Mušikić was a member of the Serbian under-16 national team that participated at the FIBA U16 European Championship in Novi Sad, Serbia. Over seven tournament games, he averaged 6.6 points, 4.7 rebounds, and 1.1 assists per game. In July 2021, Mušikić was a member of the Serbia U19 team at the FIBA Under-19 Basketball World Cup in Latvia. Over eight tournament games, he averaged 10.4 points, 4.9 rebounds, and 2.9 assists per game.

In July 2022, Mušikić was a member of the Serbian under-20 national team that won a gold medal at the 2022 FIBA U20 European Championship Division B in Tbilisi, Georgia. Over seven tournament games, he averaged 11.0 points, 3.0 rebounds, and 2.0 assists per game.

References

External links 
 Mihalo Musikic at realgm.com
 Mihalo Musikic at proballers.com
 Mihalo Musikic at eurobasket.com
 Mihailo Mušikić at aba-liga.com

2002 births
Living people
ABA League players
Basketball League of Serbia players
Centers (basketball)
KK Mega Basket players
OKK Beograd players
Serbian men's basketball players
Sportspeople from Kraljevo